Art Wittich (born 1957) was a Republican member of the Montana Legislature.  He was elected from State Senate District 35, representing Bozeman, Montana, in 2010 to 2016.

He graduated from Utah State University with a BS in Economics/Environmental Studies and a JD from University of Montana.

In 2016 Wittich was found guilty of having accepted illegal campaign contributions from the National Right to Work Committee in 2010, and ordered to pay a $68,000 fine.

References

External links
 Home page

Living people
1957 births
Republican Party Montana state senators
Politicians from Miami
Utah State University alumni
University of Montana alumni
Politicians from Bozeman, Montana
Montana politicians convicted of crimes